Camp MacArthur (or Camp McArthur) was an American military training base in Waco, Texas during World War I. It was named for General Arthur MacArthur, Jr. on July 18, 1917.

Location 
Camp MacArthur was located on a 10,699-acre tract of land in northwest Waco, Texas.  On March 7, 1919, the camp closed and the land was encompassed into the city of Waco.

History 

Shortly after the United States declared war on Germany in 1917, Waco was chosen as a site for a military training camp.  10,700 acres of cotton fields and black land farms were chosen as the site for construction. Camp MacArthur began its $5 million construction on July 20, 1917.  

The cite was named for Lt. Gen Arthur MacArthur who was a Medal of Honor recipient and fought in two American wars.  In September 1917, 18,000 troops arrived at Camp MacArthur.   Most of those soldiers were from Wisconsin and Michigan, so their arrival boosted the Waco population. Even though Camp MacArthur was built to hold about 45,000 troops, no more than 28,000 ever lived inside the compound.  

Within the camp was an officer's training school, demobilization facility, and an infantry replacement and training camp, as well as a hospital, administrative offices, and a tent camp.  Loretta Johnston, who was a nurse at Camp MacArthur, wrote of the hospital.  She described it as "very pleasing to the eye" and a "pleasant place for [the] sick and convalescent soldiers. The Thirty-Second (Red Arrow) division based at Camp MacArthur participated in combat in France in 1918.  Between 1917 and 1919, 45,074 soldiers were stationed at Camp MacArthur, nearly doubling the town's population and boosting the area's wartime economy. After the close of the camp, some of its materials were used to build United States-Mexican border stations.   After the War's conclusion, many soldiers returned to Waco. Some of the materials were used to build neighborhoods in Waco.

References

Closed installations of the United States Army
Military facilities in Texas